Štefan Balošák (born 23 November 1972 in Martin) is a Slovak former sprinter who specialised in the 400 metres. He represented his country at the 1996 and 2000 Summer Olympics as well as the 1997 World Championships.

His personal bests in the event are 45.32 seconds outdoors (Atlanta 1996) and 47.06 seconds indoors (Budapest 1997). The first result is the standing national record.

International competitions

References

1972 births
Living people
Slovak male sprinters
Athletes (track and field) at the 1996 Summer Olympics
Athletes (track and field) at the 2000 Summer Olympics
Olympic athletes of Slovakia
Sportspeople from Martin, Slovakia
World Athletics Championships athletes for Slovakia